Nightingale Informatix Corporation, commonly abbreviated as Nightingale, is a public company headquartered in Markham, Ontario, Canada with offices in Rancho Cordova, California, Cambridge, Ontario, Kansas City, Missouri, Pembroke, Massachusetts, and Wexford, Pennsylvania. Nightingale provides products and services that support physicians (family physicians and specialists), allied healthcare practitioners, hospitals and other healthcare organizations with their clinical (i.e. EMR, EHR, Patient Portal) and operational (i.e. Billing, Scheduling, Document Management) requirements. Nightingale provides EHR (Electronic Health Records) and Practice Management services, as well as a Patient Portal, Revenue Cycle Management and Medical transcription services to solo physicians, group practices and large clinics across the United States and Canada. The EMR/ EHR (Electronic Medical Records/Electronic Health Records) by Nightingale is a web-based program and is hosted in a secure ASP (Application Service Provider) environment.

Nightingale ranked no.1 in 2008 Canadian Technology companies'  Fast 50 Ranking by Deloitte  as an established software as a service (SaaS) technology-based company.

The EHR by Nightingale will be ONC-ATCB certified in summer 2011, and is OntarioMD, CMS certified for its Electronic Medical Records (EMR) and Electronic Health Records (EHR).

History

Nightingale Informatix Corporation (NGH: TSX-V) was incorporated in 2002 and acquired the intellectual property rights and assets of Vision MD, which originated in Fredericton, New Brunswick in 1997.

In 2016, Nightingale sold its  canadian assets to TELUS Health and renamed the remaining business to Nexia Health Technologies.

Products & Brand Names

Nightingale On Demand
Nightingale SmartScribes
Nightingale Medical Transcription
myPatientAccess powered by Nightingale 
Nightingale Revenue Cycle Management

References 

Companies formerly listed on the TSX Venture Exchange
Software companies of Canada
Companies based in Markham, Ontario